Eirik Haugan (born 27 August 1997) is a Norwegian footballer who plays for Molde.

Career
Growing up in Molde, Haugan started his youth career in Molde FK at the age of 5. He was a Norway youth international from 2012.

Marseille
On 28 August 2015, Haugan left Molde to join Marseille. He never appeared in the first team, be it on the pitch or on the bench.

Östersund
On 13 February 2019, Östersund announced the signing of Haugan to a three-and-a-half year contract.

Molde return
On 7 February 2022, Molde announced the return of Haugan from Östersund on a one-year contract. On 13 September 2022, Haugan extended his contract with Molde until the end of 2026.

Career statistics

Club

Honours
Eliteserien: 2022
Norwegian Cup: 2021–22

References

1997 births
Living people
Sportspeople from Ålesund
Association football defenders
Norwegian footballers
Norway youth international footballers
Molde FK players
Olympique de Marseille players
IL Hødd players
Östersunds FK players
Norwegian Second Division players
Allsvenskan players
Eliteserien players
Norwegian expatriate footballers
Expatriate footballers in France
Norwegian expatriate sportspeople in France
Expatriate footballers in Sweden
Norwegian expatriate sportspeople in Sweden